Mattson Technology Inc is an American technology company which was founded  in 1988 by Brad Mattson and is based in Fremont, California. The company is both a manufacturer and supplier in the market of semiconductor equipment globally. Its main products are dry strip system, rapid thermal processing, as well as etching. The company provides products for customers and manufacturers such as foundries, memory and logic devices.

The main offices for Mattson served as the filming location for the Cyberdyne Systems building from Terminator 2: Judgment Day.

In May 2016, Mattson Technology and Beijing ETOWN ("E-Town Dragon") jointly announced that the previously announced acquisition of Mattson by E-Town had been completed. Dr. Allen Lu has served as the company's CEO and President since October 2016.

Products and services 
The company's major products are semiconductor wafer processing equipment used in the fabrication of integrated circuits (ICs). Its dry strip products (SUPREMA) incorporates its Faraday shielded inductively coupled plasma (ICP) radio frequency source and platform used in the production at the 65 nanometer node and below. In addition, its rapid thermal processing (RTP) products (Helios, Helios XP and Millios) are used in annealing applications. These products use dual-sided, lamp-based heating technology to control the chip manufacturing. Its etch products (paradigmE and Alpine) with a combination of Faraday-shielded ICP and etch bias control for on-wafer performance. Etching is the process of removing any deposited materials or layers from the wafer's surface to create the desired pattern on the wafer's surface.

Research and development 
Mattson Technology is one of the leaders in the dry strip market and is the second largest supplier of RTP products. There are several important technologies widely used in its products, namely 45 nm transition; (Etch) Alpine, paradigm Si; (Strip) SUPREMA, SUPREMA XP5; (TPG) Helios, Helios XP, Millios.

In December 2013, Mattson Technology announced its paradigmE XP, next-generation etch system, extending the company's etch technology and enabling chipmakers to address processing challenges for leading-edge, three-dimensional semiconductor manufacturing. This new system has been qualified in Nov. by advanced DRAM device technologies.

References

External links 
 

Technology companies established in 1988
Companies formerly listed on the Nasdaq
Companies based in Fremont, California
Technology companies based in the San Francisco Bay Area